GTW may refer to:

Transportation
 Holešov Airport, in Zlín Region, Czech Republic

Rail transport
 Grand Trunk Western Railroad, an American railway
 Stadler GTW, an articulated railcar
 Gatwick Airport railway station, a railway station in Sussex, England

Road transport
 Gross trailer weight rating
 Gross train weight

Other uses
 GTW (TV station), in Western Australia
 Gateway, Inc., an American computer maker
 Geosciences Technology Workshop
 Global Trade Watch, an American consumer advocacy organization